Juan Arroyo (born 19 May 1955) is a Venezuelan former cyclist. He competed in the individual road race and team time trial events at the 1980 Summer Olympics.

References

External links
 

1955 births
Living people
Venezuelan male cyclists
Olympic cyclists of Venezuela
Cyclists at the 1980 Summer Olympics
Place of birth missing (living people)
20th-century Venezuelan people